Ruth Van Roekel McGregor (born April 4, 1943) is an American lawyer and former justice of the Arizona Supreme Court.

Legal education and experience
McGregor received a Bachelor of Arts from the University of Iowa in 1964, a Master of Arts from the University of Iowa in 1965, and her Juris Doctor from the Sandra Day O'Connor College of Law at Arizona State University 1974.

Judicial career
McGregor served as law clerk to Supreme Court of the United States justice Sandra Day O'Connor from 1981 to 1982 and served on the Arizona Court of Appeals from 1989 to 1998.

McGregor was appointed to the Arizona Supreme Court in 1998 by Governor Jane Dee Hull and remained there until her retirement in 2009. She was retained in 2000 and 2006. She served a term as chief justice that ended with her retirement from the court. She retired from the court on June 30, 2009, and was succeeded by John Pelander.

McGregor is an advocate of Arizona's version of the Missouri Plan for choosing state judges.

See also 
List of law clerks of the Supreme Court of the United States (Seat 8)

References

External links
 STATE OF THE JUDICIARY ADDRESS, March 23, 2009
 "Arizona Supreme Court Chief Justice, Ruth McGregor, Announces Retirement", Valley Fever, March 23, 2009
 Arizona Supreme Court
 Biography of McGregor on the Arizona Supreme Court website

1943 births
Living people
20th-century American judges
20th-century American women lawyers
20th-century American lawyers
21st-century American judges
Chief Justices of the Arizona Supreme Court
Justices of the Arizona Supreme Court
Law clerks of the Supreme Court of the United States
Sandra Day O'Connor College of Law alumni
University of Iowa alumni
Women chief justices of state supreme courts in the United States
20th-century American women judges
21st-century American women judges